The 2016 United States Mixed Doubles Curling Championship was held from December 2-7, 2015 at the Denver Curling Club in Denver, Colorado. Jason Smith and Jessica Schultz, both from Minnesota, won the tournament. The champions, along with the silver and bronze medal winners, earned a spot in the United States Mixed Doubles World Trials in February 2016, where the U.S. representative for the 2016 World Mixed Doubles Curling Championship in Karlstad, Sweden was decided.

Teams 
Twenty nine teams qualified to compete in the championship.

Competition

Format 
Instead of the usual round robin group play leading into playoffs, the 2016 Championship was structured with three tiers of brackets to create a triple elimination tournament. All 29 teams began in the A event bracket, if they lost they moved down to the B event bracket and if they lost again they moved to the C event bracket. If a team lost a game in the C event they were eliminated from the tournament. The winners of the A and B brackets played for the championship. However, all three bracket winners qualified for the US World Trials to compete to represent the United States at the 2016 World Mixed Doubles Championship.

A event bracket

Finals
The winners of the A and B brackets played for the championship.

Monday, December 7, 11:00 am MT

References 

United States National Curling Championships
United States Mixed Doubles Championship
United States Mixed Doubles Curling Championship
Sports competitions in Colorado
Sports in Denver
United States Mixed Doubles Curling Championship
United States